The 2006 Prix de l'Arc de Triomphe was a horse race held at Longchamp on Sunday 1 October 2006. It was the 85th running of the Prix de l'Arc de Triomphe.

The winner was Rail Link, a three-year-old colt trained in France by André Fabre. The winning jockey was Stéphane Pasquier.

The pre-race favourite Deep Impact finished third, but he was later disqualified after testing positive for a banned substance.

Race details
 Sponsor: Groupe Lucien Barrière
 Purse: €2,000,000; First prize: €1,142,800 
 Going: Good
 Distance: 2,400 metres
 Number of runners: 8
 Winner's time: 2m 26.3s

Full result

 Abbreviations: snk = short-neck; nk = neck

Winner's details
Further details of the winner, Rail Link.
 Sex: Colt
 Foaled: 26 March 2003
 Country: Great Britain
 Sire: Dansili; Dam: Docklands (Theatrical)
 Owner: Khalid Abdullah
 Breeder: Juddmonte Farms

References

External links
 Colour Chart – Arc 2006

Prix de l'Arc de Triomphe
 2006
Prix de l'Arc de Triomphe
Prix de l'Arc de Triomphe
Prix de l'Arc de Triomphe